"The Invisible Man" is a song by the British rock band Queen, written by drummer Roger Taylor but credited to Queen. The song is sung mostly by Freddie Mercury, with vocal contributions from Taylor. The song was released in August 1989 as the third single from the bands album The Miracle. Taylor claims that he got the inspiration to create the song while reading a book, and the bassline instantly came to his imagination. The song title was inspired by the H. G. Wells novel of the same name.

This song contains a distinction whereby all four band members' names are mentioned in the lyrics. The first being Freddie Mercury, followed by John Deacon. Brian May's name is then said twice (just before his guitar solo starts), and while saying "Roger Taylor", the first "r" is rolled to emulate the drums at the end of the verse. Mercury's name is announced by Taylor, and the other three by Mercury.

Music video
In the music video, a video game called "The Invisible Man" plays a large part, as a young boy is playing a game while the band (all dressed in black), who are the "bad guys" and Freddie Mercury (is their boss in the game, since he's the one who wears a virtual reality googles, while the rest of the band didn't, but instead of them wearing virtual reality googles like Freddie Mercury, they wear black shades instead) enters the real world and perform the song in his room. As they perform, the boy tries to shoot them with the game controller. From time to time, Mercury appears in various places in the child's room, vanishing before the boy can shoot him with the video controller. After Mercury emerges from the child's closet with his band in tow, John Deacon removes his cowboy hat and throws it to the floor. In perhaps a futile attempt to emulate him, the boy removes his baseball cap, and dons the other. The screen then shows an image of the band in the game once more, Deacon without a hat, and the child walks underneath them, with a "Game Over" message appearing.

A then-15-year-old Danniella Westbrook, who joined soap opera EastEnders the following year, appears in the video as the boy's sister.

Freddie Mercury's eyewear and John Deacon's cowboy hat were also used in the cover of their next single "Scandal".

Track listings 
7" Single

A Side. "The Invisible Man" (Album Version) - 3:57

B Side. "Hijack My Heart" - 4:11

12"/CD Single

A Side. "The Invisible Man" (Extended Version) - 5:28

2/B1. "Hijack My Heart" - 4:11

3/B2. "The Invisible Man" (Album Version) - 3:57

Personnel

Freddie Mercury - lead vocals
Brian May - lead guitar
Roger Taylor - drums, synthesizer, sampler, electric guitar, backing vocals,  co-lead vocals
John Deacon - bass guitar, rhythm guitar
David Richards - synthesizer, sequencer, programming

Charts

Weekly charts

Year-end charts

References

External links
 
 Lyrics at Queen official website

1989 songs
1989 singles
Queen (band) songs
Parlophone singles
Songs written by Roger Taylor (Queen drummer)
Capitol Records singles
Hollywood Records singles
Electro songs
Electronic rock songs
Songs about fictional male characters
Music based on novels